Naoufel Ben Rabah (born 18 November 1977) is a Tunisian former professional boxer who competed from 2001 to 2013. He twice challenged for the IBF light welterweight title between 2006 and 2007. 

Born in Tunisia, Ben Rabah represented his native country at the 2000 Summer Olympics. There he was eliminated in the first round of the competition. Later he became a pro and currently boxes out of Germany. On June 30, 2006 he lost a controversial decision to Juan Urango for the vacant IBF belt.

External links
 
 sports-reference

Living people
1977 births
Tunisian male boxers
Lightweight boxers
Light-welterweight boxers
Welterweight boxers
Boxers at the 2000 Summer Olympics
Olympic boxers of Tunisia
Tunisian expatriate sportspeople in Australia
African Games silver medalists for Tunisia
African Games medalists in boxing
Competitors at the 1999 All-Africa Games
Sportspeople from Tunis
20th-century Tunisian people
21st-century Tunisian people